Jack Mourioux (born 6 March 1948) is a former French cyclist. He competed in the team pursuit at the 1968 Summer Olympics.

References

External links
 

1948 births
Living people
French male cyclists
Olympic cyclists of France
Cyclists at the 1968 Summer Olympics
Cyclists from Paris
French track cyclists